The 1994 European Karate Championships, the 29th edition, was held in the sports complex of the National Indoor Arena in Birmingham, England from May 2 to 4, 1994.

Medallists

Men's competition

Individual

Team

Women's competition

Individual

Team

Medal table

References

External links
 Karate Records - European Championship 1994

1994
European Karate Championships
European championships in 1994
International sports competitions in Birmingham, West Midlands
1990s in Birmingham, West Midlands
Karate competitions in the United Kingdom
May 1994 sports events in Europe